Lieven Ferdinand de Beaufort (March 23, 1879 in Den Treek, Leusden – 11 May 1968 in  Amersfoort) was a Dutch biologist who, in 1903, participated in the North New Guinea Expedition. In the 1920s he was director of the Zoological Museum of Artis in Amsterdam and later zoogeography professor at the University of Amsterdam.

Beaufort is commemorated in the scientific name of a species of lizard, Sphenomorphus beauforti, which is a synonym of Sphenomorphus schultzei.

See also
:Category:Taxa named by Lieven Ferdinand de Beaufort

References

Sources
Prof. dr. L.F. de Beaufort, 1879 - 1968 at the University of Amsterdam Album Academicum website

1879 births
1968 deaths
Dutch zoologists
Academic staff of the University of Amsterdam
University of Amsterdam alumni
People from Heusden